The New York Federation of College Republicans, also known as the NYFCR, is an organization that oversees College Republicans chapters across the state of New York. The NYFCR and its chapters are made up of college and university students who support the Republican Party of the United States. In 2021, the NYFCR withdrew from the College Republican National Committee. The NYFCR now functions as an independent organization, and is affiliated with different Republican and conservative groups in New York state, including the New York Republican State Committee and the New York Young Republican Club.

The executive board of NYFCR is made up of ten positions headed by a chairperson. The current chairman of the organization is James Marci.

In July 2021, the NYFCR was denied a delegation at the CRNC national convention. The NYFCR alleged this was due to vote rigging in a press release later circulated by congressmen Elise Stefanik, Claudia Tenney, and Paul Gosar. State GOP chairs Nick Langworthy and Kelli Ward also voiced their support of the NYFCR.

On July 13, the NYFCR published a dossier alleging that then-chairman Chandler Thornton had been mismanaging the CRNC's funds. The report cited the CRNC's advertising budget, which showed more than $1,000,000 in funds unaccounted for. Uncertainty over the fate of a $122,000 donation from Kid Rock also became a point of contention.

On July 24, the university chapters of the NYFCR voted unanimously to withdraw from the CRNC.

History

References 

Republican Party (United States) organizations
Conservative organizations in the United States
Student wings of political parties in the United States
Youth wings of political parties in the United States